Art Blakey's Jazz Messengers with Thelonious Monk is a studio album released in 1958 by Atlantic Records. It is a collaboration between the Jazz Messengers, the group led by drummer Art Blakey, and Thelonious Monk on piano.

Background 
Throughout the preceding decade, on sessions for both Blue Note and Riverside, Blakey had supported Monk on various occasions. Monk returned the favor on this one-off session for Atlantic. Blakey was on the verge of beginning a long-term contract with Blue Note, while Monk was in the middle of his stay on Riverside.

One month after these recordings, Monk would begin his summer and autumn residency at the Five Spot on Cooper Square after regaining his cabaret card, without which he had been barred from playing in most of New York City's clubs. Monk's quartet featuring John Coltrane at that residency would bring Monk fame beyond the inner circle of jazz aficionados. Atlantic released this album over a year after it was recorded, thereby capitalizing on Monk's increased visibility.

This was the first album featuring Monk to be recorded in stereo; its sessions preceded the Riverside album Monk's Music by roughly 5 weeks.

Reception 
Billboard in 1958 gave the album three stars out of four, stating that it has some "mighty good jazz". AllMusic gave the album a four-star rating out of a possible five stars, with writer Lindsay Planer noting that "both co-leaders are at the peak of their respective prowess with insightful interpretations of nearly half a dozen inspired performances from this incarnation of the Blakey-led Jazz Messengers." The Penguin Guide to Jazz assigned its "crown" accolade to the album.

On February 16, 1999, Rhino Records reissued the album remastered for compact disc. Three bonus tracks were included, all outtakes from the May 1957 sessions.

Track listing

Side one

Side two

1999 bonus tracks

Personnel 
 Art Blakey – drums
 Bill Hardman – trumpet
 Johnny Griffin – tenor saxophone
 Thelonious Monk – piano
 Spanky DeBrest – bass

Additional personnel 
 Nesuhi Ertegün – production
 Earl Brown – recording engineering
 Bob Carlton, Patrick Milligan – reissue supervision
 Dan Hersch – digital remastering

References 

Atlantic Records albums
Thelonious Monk albums
Art Blakey albums
The Jazz Messengers albums
1958 albums
Albums produced by Nesuhi Ertegun
Collaborative albums